Steve Sims may refer to:

 Steve Sims (footballer) (born 1957), English footballer
 Steve Sims (boxer) (born 1958), Welsh boxer
 Steve Sims (entrepreneur) (born 1966), founder and CEO of the concierge service Bluefish
 Steven Sims (born 1997), American football player